= Mutants in Mega City One =

Mutants in Mega City One may refer to:

- "Mutants in Mega-City One", 1985 single by the English band the Fink Brothers
- "Mutants in Mega-City One", 2007 Judge Dredd story, published in the comic 2000 AD
